The River Bride is a river in Dorset, England, situated between the towns of Dorchester and Bridport. It rises at an altitude of  beneath an artificial lake at Bridehead House, Littlebredy, then flows west to its mouth on the English Channel near Burton Bradstock. It reaches the coast just west of Burton Bradstock through a break in coastal cliffs at Burton Freshwater; here it meets the western end of Chesil Beach where it "forms itself into a pool and fights to get to the sea intact before sinking into the shingle."

The river's name is of Celtic origin. It is derived from Old Welsh Brydi, related to Cornish bredion "to boil", so means "boiling or gushing" stream.  The river gives its name to Long Bredy, Littlebredy, Burton Bradstock and probably Bridport.

Notes

Bride